is a Japanese wrestler. He competed in the men's Greco-Roman light heavyweight at the 1964 Summer Olympics.

References

1935 births
Living people
Japanese male sport wrestlers
Olympic wrestlers of Japan
Wrestlers at the 1964 Summer Olympics
Sportspeople from Hiroshima
20th-century Japanese people